Karl T. Hirsch (born October 17, 1970 in Phoenix, Arizona) is an American film director and producer. He retired from filmmaking in 2015.

Awards
Audience Favourite at the Victoria Independent Film & Video Festival (1998, won for Green)
Breakthrough Award at the Newport Beach Film Festival (1998, won for Green)
Best in the 'Film is a Four Letter Word' Series at the Valleyfest Film Festival (1999, won for Green)
Best Arizona Filmmaker at the Phoenix Film Festival (2001, won for Green and Karl's in a Coma)
Festival Director's Award at Method Fest Independent Film Festival (2005, for Clown)

Filmography

Films
Green (1998)  
Killer Bud (2001)
Scarecrow (2002)
Starkweather (2004)
The Third Wish (2005)
Officer Down (2005)
Comedy Hell (2006)
Aces (2006)
Fist of the Warrior (2007)
Frame of Mind (2009)
Jill and Jac (2010)
Making Change (2012)
For the Love of Money (2012)
Kill 'em All (2012)
Abraham Lincoln vs. Zombies (2012, as writer)
88 (2015)

Shorts
Karl's in a Coma (2000)
Media Whore (2002)
Clown (2005)
Club Soda (2006)
Remedy (2009)
I Saw a Movie (2009)
Fix Me: The Workout (2012)
Fix Me: The Nanny (2012)
Fix Me: The Trainer (2012)
Dispossessed (2012)

References

External links
 

1970 births
American film directors
Living people